"Don't Say Goodbye Girl" is a song by American R&B singer Tevin Campbell. It was written by Burt Bacharach, Sally Jo Dakota, and Narada Michael Walden for his second studio album I'm Ready (1993), while production was helmed by the latter along with Louis Biancaniello. The song was released as the album's fourth single, reaching number 71 on the US Billboard Hot 100 and number 28 on the Hot R&B/Hip-Hop Songs chart.

Track listings

Notes
 denotes associate producer
 denotes additional producer

Credits and personnel
Credits adapted from liner notes.

Tevin Campbell – lead and background vocals
Narada Michael Walden – writer, composer, producer and arranger
Burt Bacharach – writer, composer
Sally Jo Dakota – writer, composer
Louis "Kingpin" Biancaniello – associate producer, keyboards, programming and synth arrangements

David "Frazeman" Frazer – recording and mixing engineer
Marc "Elvis" Reyburn – recording engineer
Matt Rohr – assistant engineer
Janice Lee, Cynthia Shiloh and Kevin Walden – production coordinators

Charts

References

Tevin Campbell songs
1994 singles
Songs with music by Burt Bacharach
Songs written by Narada Michael Walden
Song recordings produced by Narada Michael Walden
1993 songs
Songs written by Sally Jo Dakota